Joseph Morales (born August 22, 1994) is an American mixed martial artist who competed in the Flyweight division of the Ultimate Fighting Championship.

Mixed martial arts career

Early career

In his MMA debut at WSOF 16, Joseph defeated Christian Espinosa via unanimous decision. Then he defeated Roque Reyes via TKO in the first round. At WFC 14, Joseph submitted Benji Gomez in the second round via rear naked choke. He also tapped out Gerald Bailey in round one via guillotine choke at GKO 4. Joseph submitted his next two opponents in Sammy Saunders and Gerald Bailey respectively. At GKO 8, he defeated Josh Paiva via unanimous decision, earning him the GKO Flyweight Championship. At CFFC 64 Joseph defeated Sean Santella via TKO in the second round and earned his ticket to the UFC in the process.

Ultimate Fighting Championship

Morales made his promotional debut on August 5, 2017 at UFC Fight Night: Pettis vs. Moreno, facing Roberto Sanchez.  He won the fight via a rear-naked choke in round one and earned a Performance of the Night bonus.

On February 3, 2018 Morales faced Deiveson Figueiredo at UFC Fight Night: Machida vs. Anders. He lost the fight via technical knockout in round two.

Morales faced Eric Shelton on November 10, 2018 at UFC Fight Night: Korean Zombie vs. Rodríguez. He lost the fight via split decision.

After losing his last two fights, Morales got released from the UFC in May 2019.

Post-UFC career
Morales made his return to mixed martial arts, after a three year absence from the sport, to face Kevin Wirth at Cage Warriors 126 on August 1, 2021. Morales won the fight by unanimous decision.

Morales faced Sidemar Honorio on March 4, 2022 at Cage Warriors 133. He won the bout via split decision.

Morales won the A1C Flyweight Championship on February 3, 2023, submitting Anthony Do in the third round via triangle choke.

Championships and achievements

Mixed martial arts
Ultimate Fighting Championship
Performance of the Night (One Time) 
Global Knockout
GKO Flyweight Championship (One Time)

Mixed martial arts record

|-
|Win
|align=center|12–2
|Anthony Do
|Submission (triangle choke)
|Urijah Faber's A1 Combat 8
|
|align=center|3
|align=center|4:46
|Lemoore, California, United States
|
|-
|Win
|align=center| 11–2
|Sidemar Honorio
|Decision (split)
|Cage Warriors 133
|
|align=center|3
|align=center|5:00
|San Diego, California, United States
|
|-
| Win
| align=center| 10–2
| Kevin Wirth
|Decision (unanimous)
|Cage Warriors 126
|
|align=center|3
|align=center|5:00
|San Diego, California, United States
| 
|-
| Loss
| align=center| 9–2
|Eric Shelton
|Decision (split)
|UFC Fight Night: Korean Zombie vs. Rodríguez 
|
|align=center|3
|align=center|5:00
|Denver, Colorado, United States
| 
|-
| Loss
| align=center| 9–1
| Deiveson Figueiredo
|TKO (punches)
|UFC Fight Night: Machida vs. Anders
|
|align=center|2
|align=center|4:34
|Belém, Brazil
|
|-
| Win
| align=center| 9–0
|Roberto Sanchez
|Submission (rear-naked choke)
|UFC Fight Night: Pettis vs. Moreno
|
|align=center|1
|align=center|3:56
|Mexico City, Mexico
|
|-
| Win
| align=center| 8–0
| Sean Santella
| TKO (punches)
|CFFC 64 - Sayles vs. Aguilera
|
|align=center|2
|align=center|3:24
|San Diego, California, United States
|
|-
| Win
| align=center|7–0
| Josh Paiva
| Decision (unanimous)
|Global Knockout 8
|
|align=center| 5
|align=center| 5:00
|Jackson, California, United States
|
|-
| Win
| align=center|6–0
| Gerald Bailey
|Submission (rear-naked choke)
|Global Knockout 7
|
|align=center|1
|align=center|3:48
|Jackson, California, United States
|
|-
| Win
| align=center|5–0
| Sammy Saunders
| Submission (triangle choke)
| Global Knockout 6
| 
| align=center|1
| align=center|3:50
| Jackson, California, United States
|
|-
| Win
| align=center|4–0
| Gerald Bailey
|Submission (rear-naked choke)
|Global Knockout 4
|
|align=center|1
|align=center|2:30
|Jackson, California, United States
|
|-
| Win
| align=center| 3–0
| Benji Gomez
|Submission (rear-naked choke)
| WFC 14
| 
| align=center|2
| align=center|2:21
| Sacramento, California, United States
| 
|-
| Win
| align=center| 2–0
| Roque Reyes
| TKO (punches)
| WCFC 13
| 
| align=center| 1
| align=center| 1:43
| Sacramento, California, United States
| 
|-
| Win
| align=center| 1–0
| Christian Espinosa
| Decision (unanimous)
|WSOF 16
| 
|align=center|3
|align=center|5:00
| Sacramento, California, United States
|

See also 
 List of male mixed martial artists

References

External links 
  
  

1994 births
Living people
American male mixed martial artists
Flyweight  mixed martial artists
Ultimate Fighting Championship male fighters